Self-reliance (and similar compound nouns) may refer to:
 The personal attribute, in its context as a core element of individualism
 Self-sustainability
 Self-help
 "Self-Reliance", an essay by transcendentalist writer Ralph Waldo Emerson
 Self Reliance, a 2023 film directed by Jake Johnson
 "Self Reliance", an episode of Dawson's Creek, an American television series
 Self Reliance (political party), in Ukraine